Rhydderch or Riderch is a Welsh male given name being a compound of the elements "rhi" (ruler) and "derch" (exalted). Earliest mentions of the name are:

 Riderch I of Alt Clut (Rhydderch Hael) (fl. 580; died c. 614)
 Riderch II of Alt Clut (fl. early 9th century)
 Rhydderch ap Dyfnwal (fl. 971)
 Rhydderch ap Iestyn (died 1033)

See also 
 Llanddewi Rhydderch, Monmouthshire
 White Book of Rhydderch, a Welsh manuscript compiled for Rhydderch ab Ieuan Llwyd (c. 1325–1400)
 Prothero

Welsh given names